, "Hibari's Circus: Sad Little Dove" is a 1952 black and white Japanese film directed by Mizuho Shunkai.

Cast
 Hibari Misora
 Keiji Sada 
 Keiko Kishi
 Kuniko Miyake 
 Shunji Sakai 
 Ichirō Shimizu 
 Ryūji Kita 
 Haruhisa Kawada
 Shin Tokudaiji 
 Akio Isono 
 Kazuko Motohashi 
 Eiko Takamatsu 
 Reiko Mizukami
 Taeko Hira

See also
 List of films in the public domain in the United States

References

Japanese black-and-white films
1952 films
Films directed by Mizuho Shunkai
Shochiku films
1950s Japanese films